Joe Kuzminsky (born January 26, 1994) is an American soccer player who currently plays for Colorado Springs Switchbacks in the USL Championship.

Career
Kuzminsky played five years of college soccer at the University of Alabama at Birmingham between 2012 and 2016, including a red-shirted year in 2012.

Kuzminsky also played with USL PDL side Real Colorado Foxes in 2014.

Kuzminsky signed with USL Championship club Charleston Battery on March 21, 2017.

In January 2020, Kuzminsky was sent on a season-long loan to Maccabi Haifa of the Israeli Premier League.

Kuzminsky entered the 2022 season as the longest-tenured player on the Battery, his sixth year with the team. He played his 100th overall game for the club on April 23, 2022, against Louisville City FC, a 1-1 draw at home. Kuzminsky also scored the fire goal of his career during the 2022 season, finding the back of the net in stoppage time against Loudoun United FC in a successful last-ditch effort to earn a 1-1 draw at the death. Following the 2022 season, Kuzminsky was released by Charleston.

On December 9, 2022, it was announced that Kuzminsky would join USL Championship side Colorado Springs Switchbacks for their 2023 season.

References

1994 births
Living people
American soccer players
Association football goalkeepers
Jewish American sportspeople
Charleston Battery players
Real Colorado Foxes players
Soccer players from Denver
UAB Blazers men's soccer players
USL Championship players
USL League Two players
Maccabi Haifa F.C. players
American expatriate soccer players
American expatriate sportspeople in Israel
Expatriate footballers in Israel
21st-century American Jews
Colorado Springs Switchbacks FC players